Blue Key Honor Society is an American national honor society for college upperclassmen. Blue Key has over 50 chartered collegiate chapters within the United States.

History 
Blue Key Honor Society was founded as Blue Key National Honor Fraternity at the University of Florida in 1924.  The UF chapter separated from the national Blue Key organization during the 1930s and has been known since as Florida Blue Key.  The oldest extant chapter of Blue Key is located at Emory and Henry College and was founded in 1925.

In 2003, the organization's name was officially changed to Blue Key Honor Society.

Notable members
Lowell C. Smith, president of Nichols College

See also
 Florida Blue Key

References

Honor societies
Organizations established in 1924